Vriesea agostiniana is a plant species in the genus Vriesea. This species is endemic to Brazil.

References

agostiniana
Endemic flora of Brazil